Paradise Lost is the debut studio album that was written and produced by British drum and bass DJ duo Delta Heavy. It was originally scheduled to be released on 4 March 2016, but was pushed back to 18 March 2016. It was released through RAM Records and features the hit singles, "Ghost" and "Punish My Love".

Track listing
Note: All tracks produced by Delta Heavy. All tracks written by Delta Heavy, except where noted:

2016 debut albums
Drum and bass albums